The Nubian Sandstone Aquifer System (NSAS) is the world's largest known fossil water aquifer system. It is located underground in the Eastern end of the Sahara desert and spans the political boundaries of four countries in north-eastern Africa. NSAS covers a land area spanning just over two million km2, including north-western Sudan, north-eastern Chad, south-eastern Libya, and most of Egypt. Containing an estimated 150,000 km3 of groundwater, the significance of the NSAS as a potential water resource for future development programs in these countries is extraordinary. The Great Man-Made River (GMMR) project in Libya makes use of the system, extracting substantial amounts of water from this aquifer, removing an estimated 2.4 km3 of fresh water for consumption and agriculture per year.

Characteristics

Since 2001, the Nubian Sandstone aquifer situated between the Toshka and Abu Simbel areas of Egypt has undergone intensive drilling and development as part of a land reclamation project. Drilling information was used to conduct a variety of studies regarding the hydrogeological setting of the area's aquifer. Results indicated that lithological characteristics and tectonic settings are having a substantial effect on groundwater flow patterns and the area's overall aquifer potentiality, which is considered relatively low when compared to neighboring areas in eastern Oweinat or Dakhla.

Geology
The aquifer is largely composed of hard ferruginous sandstone with great shale and clay intercalation, having a thickness that ranges between 140 and 230 meters. Groundwater type varies from fresh to slightly brackish (salinity ranges from 240 to 1300 ppm). The ion dominance ordering shows that sodium cation is most commonly predominating over calcium and magnesium – whereas chloride is predominant over sulfate and bicarbonate. The groundwater is of meteoric origin (the term meteoric water refers to water that originated as precipitation; most groundwater is meteoric in origin). High concentrations of sodium, chloride, and sulfates reflect the leaching and dissolution processes of gypsiferous shales and clay, in addition to a lengthy duration of water residence.

International development projects
Since 2006, the International Atomic Energy Agency has been working in cooperation with the four NSAS countries to help increase understanding of the aquifer's complexities through the IAEA-UNDP-GEF Nubian Project. Project partners include the United Nations Development Programme (UNDP)/Global Environment Facility (GEF), IAEA, United Nations Educational, Scientific and Cultural Organization (UNESCO) and government representatives from the NSAS countries. The project's long-term goal is establishing rational and equitable management of the NSAS as a productive way of advancing socio-economic development in the region and protecting biodiversity and land resources.

See also 
 Lake Ptolemy
 African humid period

References

Bibliography
 Essay and Maps: Groundwater Resources of the Nubian Aquifer System
 Dahab, K.A., El Sayed, E.A. Study of Hydrogeological Conditions of the Nubian Sandstone Aguifer in the Area Between Abu Simbel & Toschka, Western Desert, Egypt. American Geophysical Union, Spring 2001

Aquifers
Aquifers of Africa
Springs of Africa
Sahara
Geography of Libya
Geology of Libya
Springs of Libya
Springs of Chad
Springs of Egypt
Springs of Sudan